The Blythe River is a perennial river located in north-western region of Tasmania, Australia.

Location and features
The river rises near Rabbit Plain on the slopes of Mount Tor and flows generally north into Emu Bay in Bass Strait, at Heybridge, near . The river descends  over its  course.

The local economy relies on mining and recreational fishing.

See also

References

Rivers of Tasmania
North West Tasmania